The Hart 415T is a four-stroke, 1.5-litre, turbocharged, inline four-cylinder racing Internal combustion engine, designed, developed and tuned by Brian Hart of Hart Racing Engines, for use in Formula One racing and competition, between 1981 and 1986. The engines were used by Toleman, RAM, Spirit, and Haas Lola.

Applications
Toleman TG181
Toleman TG183
Toleman TG184
Toleman TG185
Spirit 101
RAM 01
RAM 02
Lola THL1

References

Straight-four engines
Formula One engines